The 2013–14 Nemzeti Bajnokság II football season was a single sixteen-team league, unlike previous years, which had two geographically-based sixteen-team groups. BFC Siofok and Egri FC were relegated from the 2012–13 Nemzeti Bajnokság I, but Egri FC did not receive a license for the national championship. Eight teams (the teams placed 2nd–5th in both the East and West groups) qualified directly from the 2012–13 Nemzeti Bajnokság II, while the teams placed 6th–8th place competed in play-offs with the group winners of the Nemzeti Bajnokság III to complete the line-up.

Teams

Stadium and locations
Following is the list of clubs competing in 2013–14 Nemzeti Bajnokság II, with their location, stadium and stadium capacity.

Personnel and kits
Following is the list of clubs competing in 2013–14 Nemzeti Bajnokság II, with their manager, captain, kit manufacturer and shirt sponsor.

Managerial changes

League table

Positions by round

Results

Top goalscorers
Including matches played on 1 June 2014; Source:

References

External links
  

Nemzeti Bajnokság II seasons
2013–14 in Hungarian football
Hun